Morula peasei is a species of sea snail, a marine gastropod mollusk in the family Muricidae, the murex snails or rock snails.

Description

Distribution
This marine species occurs off Tahiti,  French Polynesia

References

External links
 Houart, R. (2002). Comments on a group of small Morula s.s. species (Gastropoda: Muricidae: Rapaninae) from the Indo-West Pacific with the description of two new species. Novapex. 3 (4): 97-118.

peasei
Gastropods described in 2002